This article lists the world's longest road routes that are either officially numbered or otherwise known under a single name. Some of the roads may still be partially planned or under construction.

Longest highways overall

Longest expressways

See also 

 List of countries by road network size
 List of longest ring roads

References 

Transport-related lists of superlatives
Longest things